Little Falls station is a NJ Transit station located at Union Avenue in Little Falls, New Jersey. The station, on the Montclair-Boonton Line is the first to receive limited revenue service due to the end of electrification at the site of the former Great Notch station.

History 

The station is located along the Montclair-Boonton Line, a former alignment of the New York and Greenwood Lake Railway (NYGL), run by the Erie Railroad. The line ran from the Erie's Pavonia Terminal in Jersey City to Sterling Forest station on the New Jersey / New York state line. The station was the second of three built in Little Falls, the others being Great Notch station in the Great Notch district and the Singac station. The current railroad depot, a one-story brick structure, was built by the Erie in 1915.

The Greenwood Lake Line was cut back to Wanaque–Midvale station in 1935 and then cut entirely in 1966, but service on this portion of the line was transferred to the newly created Boonton Line, a mix of the New York and Greenwood Lake and the Delaware, Lackawanna and Western Railroad's Boonton Branch. In 1983, seven years after the death of the Erie-Lackawanna Railroad, (after which service had been provided by Conrail), New Jersey Transit took over railroad operations and maintenance of the building. Formerly one of three stations in Little Falls, it has become the only one in downtown Little Falls, after Great Notch was closed by New Jersey Transit in January 2010.

Station layout 
This station has one track for revenue service, one track used as a passing siding, and one side platform. The station has a brick station depot completed in 1915. It also has 194 parking spaces, 134 on Railroad Avenue at Montclair Avenue and 60 more along Montclair Avenue. A ticket machine is available. The station is not compliant with the Americans with Disabilities Act of 1990.

There is no weekend service to Little Falls, as all service terminates at Bay Street station in Montclair, New Jersey. Bus service is provided by New Jersey Transit with four lines meeting at Little Falls station by the No. 11, No. 191, No. 704 and No. 705.

See also 
Singac, New Jersey

Bibliography

References

External links

 Station from Montclair Avenue from Google Maps Street View

NJ Transit Rail Operations stations
Railway stations in Passaic County, New Jersey
Former Erie Railroad stations
Railway stations in the United States opened in 1873
1873 establishments in New Jersey